Chorizanthe ventricosa, common name Priest Valley spineflower, is a plant species endemic to a small region in the Coastal Ranges of west-central California. It is found only on serpentine outcrops in grasslands and pine-oak woodlands at elevations of 500–1000 m. It has been reported from 4 counties: Monterey, San Benito, Fresno and San Luis Obispo.

Chorizanthe ventricosa is an herb up to 70 cm tall, forming large spreading colonies. Leaves are up to 5 cm long. Flowers are formed in clusters up to 6 cm across, with green bracts with pointed tips giving the impression of spines. Flowers are 2-colored, white or yellow plus red or maroon.

References

ventricosa
Endemic flora of California
Natural history of the California chaparral and woodlands
Natural history of the California Coast Ranges
Natural history of Fresno County, California
Natural history of Monterey County, California
Natural history of San Benito County, California
Natural history of San Luis Obispo County, California
Flora without expected TNC conservation status